Vera Hilger (born 1971) is a German painter.

Life and work
Vera Hilger was born in Schleiden, Germany,

 1991 - 1993 Vera Hilger studied Philosophy and German studies at the RWTH Aachen University
 1993 - 1997 graduation from the Maastricht Academy of Fine Arts

After completing her studies in the Netherlands she moved into her main studio in the Belgian town Verviers, and a second studio at Cologne was retained.
Her paintings mostly focused the characteristic east Belgian landscape. The works did not reflect a realistic image, but they were deeply involved with the atmosphere of the landscapes. 
From 2009, her paintings changed more and more by combining rhythmic elements and patterns with the depth in the picture plane and opened the way towards the now exclusively abstract painting.

Vera Hilger lives and works in Hauset/Belgium and Cologne/Germany.

Selected exhibitions
2015  Into other Scapes,  Museum van Bommel van Dam, Venlo (NL) | fuzzy sets, artothek Köln (D)
2014 Die Grosse Kunstausstellung NRW, Museum Kunstpalast Düsseldorf (D)
2013 edition norm, Barbette - Berlin | OSTRALE´013, Dresden (D) | Intervalle, Kirche St. Marien in Würselen (D) 
2012  Kunstroute, Wanda Reiff, Bemelen (NL) | Prix Louis Schmidt, Musee d'art contemporain - Freie Universität Brüssel (B) | Pulsar, Bild für die Kirche St. Nikolaus (Citykirche), Aachen (D)
 2011    exhibition celebrating the nomination to the IKOB Arts Award 2011 at the Museum of Contemporary Art in Eupen (B) | Vera Hilger - Works 2010/11, Gallery Freitag 18.30, Aachen (D)
 2009   Gleam, Siegerlandmuseum-Haus Oranienstrasse, Siegen (D)
 2008   grant at Starke Foundation, Artist in residence, Berlin (D)
 2007   grant at Starke Foundation, Artist in residence, Berlin (D) | Gallery Geymüller, Essen (D) | Gallery Arcane, Liège (B)
 2006   Sfumato, Raum für Kunst, Aachen | Landscape, Gallery Wolfs, Maastricht (NL)
 2004   petit comité, Gallery Wolfs, Maastricht (NL)
 2003   Walk, Gallery Wolfs, Maastricht (NL)
 2002   Gallery Wolfs, Maastricht (NL)
 2001   Gallery Pin, Bielefeld (D)
 2000   Gallery Cave Canem, Aachen (D)
 1999   Gallery Cave Canem, Aachen (D)
 1997   Graduates' exhibition Akademie Of Arts Maastricht
 1995   Gallery van Laethem, Hasselt (group exhibition)

Awards and scholarships

2011   nomination for the IKOB Arts Award 2011, Eupen (B)
2008   Artist in residence, grant at Starke Foundation, Berlin (D)
2007   Artist in residence, grant at Starke Foundation, Berlin (D)

Catalogues and editions

 Gleam, publisher: Siegerlandmuseum, Siegen, 2009
 Sfumato, publisher: Raum für Kunst, Aachen 2006
 Walk, publisher: Gallery Wolfs, Maastricht 2003

References

External links
 official website (English)

1971 births
Living people
20th-century German painters
21st-century German painters
German women painters
People from Euskirchen (district)
People from Raeren
20th-century German women
21st-century German women
RWTH Aachen University alumni